Gary Jeffress is a research professor of Geographic Information Science in the Department of Computing and Mathematical Sciences of Texas A&M University-Corpus Christi. He is the former director of the Conrad Blucher Institute for Surveying and Science retiring from the position in 2018. He is the former president of the Texas Society of Professional Surveyors (1999) and of the Geographic and Land Information Society (2005).

Education
He attended Hurlstone Agricultural High School, Glenfield, New South Wales, Australia, graduating in 1971.
He received his Bachelor of Surveying, School of Surveying, University of New South Wales, Australia, in 1978
and his Master of Surveying Science, School of Surveying, University of New South Wales, Australia, also in 1987.
He received his Ph.D. (Surveying Engineering) with a minor in Economics from the Department of Surveying Engineering at the University of Maine in 1991

Professional and academic life
He is a registered professional land surveyor in Texas, Maine, and Australia. Jeffress has been one of the original co-principal investigators of the Texas Coastal Ocean Observation Network since 1991, and held the Blucher Chair of Excellence in Surveying from 1990 to 1991. He has held teaching positions in Australia and the United States, and has also taught short courses in Haiti.

Jeffress continues to collect and analyze geographic data and information for land management and development. His research interests incorporate GIS and digital surveying applications in environmental management, land titling, and land administration.

Jeffress is also involved in promoting surveying and GIS education.  He organized and coordinated the 2006 GLIS GIS Competition for high school students, sponsored by the Environmental Systems Research Institute (ESRI).

References

External links
 http://gisc.tamucc.edu/
 http://cbi.tamucc.edu/
 http://www.tsps.org/

American surveyors
Australian academics
Living people
Year of birth missing (living people)
Texas A&M University–Corpus Christi faculty